James Butler Hickok (May 27, 1837August 2, 1876), better known as "Wild Bill" Hickok, was a folk hero of the American Old West known for his life on the frontier as a soldier, scout, lawman, cattle rustler, gunslinger, gambler, showman, and actor, and for his involvement in many famous gunfights. He earned a great deal of notoriety in his own time, much of it bolstered by the many outlandish and often fabricated tales he told about himself. Some contemporaneous reports of his exploits are known to be fictitious, but they remain the basis of much of his fame and reputation.

Hickok was born and raised on a farm in northern Illinois at a time when lawlessness and vigilante activity were rampant because of the influence of the "Banditti of the Prairie". Drawn to this ruffian lifestyle, he headed west at age 18 as a fugitive from justice, working as a stagecoach driver and later as a lawman in the frontier territories of Kansas and Nebraska. He fought and spied for the Union Army during the American Civil War and gained publicity after the war as a scout, marksman, actor, and professional gambler. He was involved in several notable shootouts during the course of his life.

In 1876, Hickok was shot and killed while playing poker in a saloon in Deadwood, Dakota Territory (present-day South Dakota) by Jack McCall, an unsuccessful gambler. The hand of cards which he supposedly held at the time of his death has become known as the dead man's hand: two pairs; black aces and eights.

Hickok remains a popular figure of frontier history. Many historic sites and monuments commemorate his life, and he has been depicted numerous times in literature, film, and television. He is chiefly portrayed as a protagonist, although historical accounts of his actions are often controversial, and much of his career is known to have been exaggerated both by himself and by contemporary mythmakers. While Hickok claimed to have killed numerous named and unnamed gunmen in his lifetime, his career as a gunfighter only lasted from 1861 to 1871. According to Joseph G. Rosa, Hickok's biographer and the foremost authority on Wild Bill, Hickok killed only six or seven men in gunfights.

Early life
James Butler Hickok was born May 27, 1837, in Homer, Illinois, (present-day Troy Grove, Illinois) to William Alonzo Hickok, a farmer and abolitionist, and his wife, Polly Butler. Hickok was of English ancestry. James was the fourth of six children. His father was said to have used the family house, now demolished, as a station on the Underground Railroad. William Hickok died in 1852, when James was 15.

Hickok was a good shot from a young age, and was recognized locally as an outstanding marksman with a pistol. Photographs of Hickok appear to depict dark hair, but all contemporaneous descriptions affirm that it was red.

In 1855, at age 18, James Hickok fled Illinois following a fight with Charles Hudson, during which both fell into a canal; each thought, mistakenly, that he had killed the other. Hickok moved to Leavenworth in the Kansas Territory, where he joined Jim Lane's Free State Army (also known as the Jayhawkers), an antislavery vigilante group active in the new territory during the Bleeding Kansas era. While a Jayhawker, he met 12-year-old William Cody (later known as "Buffalo Bill"), who, despite his youth, served as a scout just two years later for the U.S. Army during the Utah War.

Nicknames

Hickok used his late father's name, William Hickok, from 1858, and the name William Haycock during the American Civil War. Most newspapers referred to him as William Haycock until 1869. He was arrested while using the name Haycock in 1865. He afterward resumed using his given name, James Hickok. Military records after 1865 list him as Hickok, but note that he was also known as Haycock. In an 1867 article about his shootout with Davis Tutt, his surname was misspelled as Hitchcock.

While in Nebraska, Hickok was derisively referred to by one man as "Duck Bill" for his long nose and protruding lips. He was also known before 1861 among Jayhawkers as "Shanghai Bill" because of his height and slim build. He grew a moustache following the McCanles incident, and in 1861 began calling himself "Wild Bill".

Early career
In 1857, Hickok claimed a  tract in Johnson County, Kansas, near present-day Lenexa. On March 22, 1858, he was elected one of the first four constables of Monticello Township. In 1859, he joined the Russell, Majors and Waddell freight company, the parent company of the Pony Express.

In 1860, Hickok was badly injured by a bear, while driving a freight team from Independence, Missouri, to Santa Fe, New Mexico. According to Hickok's account, he found the road blocked by a cinnamon bear and its two cubs. Dismounting, he approached the bear and fired a shot into its head, but the bullet ricocheted off its skull, infuriating it. The bear attacked, crushing Hickok with its body. Hickok managed to fire another shot, wounding the bear's paw. The bear then grabbed his arm in its mouth, but Hickok was able to grab his knife and slash its throat, killing it.

Hickok was severely injured, with a crushed chest, shoulder, and arm. He was bedridden for four months before being sent to Rock Creek Station in the Nebraska Territory to work as a stable hand while he recovered. There, the freight company had built a stagecoach stop along the Oregon Trail near Fairbury, Nebraska, on land purchased from David McCanles.

McCanles shooting

On July 12, 1861, David McCanles went to the Rock Creek Station office to demand an overdue property payment from Horace Wellman, the station manager. McCanles reportedly threatened Wellman, and either Wellman or Hickok, who was hiding behind a curtain, killed McCanles. Hickok, Wellman, and another employee, J.W. Brink, were tried for killing McCanles, but were found to have acted in self-defense. McCanles may have been the first man Hickok killed. Hickok subsequently visited McCanles' widow, apologized for the killing, and offered her $35 in restitution, all the money he had with him at the time.

Civil War service
After the Civil War broke out in April 1861, Hickok became a teamster for the Union Army in Sedalia, Missouri. By the end of 1861, he was a wagon master, but in September 1862, he was discharged for unknown reasons. He then joined General James Henry Lane's Kansas Brigade, and while serving with the brigade, saw his friend Buffalo Bill Cody, who was serving as a scout.

In late 1863, Hickok worked for the provost marshal of southwest Missouri as a member of the Springfield detective police. His work included identifying and counting the number of troops in uniform who were drinking while on duty, verifying hotel liquor licenses, and tracking down individuals who owed money to the cash-strapped Union Army.

Buffalo Bill claimed that he encountered Hickok disguised as a Confederate officer in Missouri in 1864. Hickok had not been paid for some time, and was hired as a scout by General John B. Sanborn by early 1865. In June, Hickok mustered out and went to Springfield, where he gambled. The 1883 History of Greene County, Missouri described him as "by nature a ruffian ... a drunken, swaggering fellow, who delighted when 'on a spree' to frighten nervous men and timid women."

Lawman and scout

Duel with Davis Tutt

While in Springfield, Hickok and a local gambler named Davis Tutt had several disagreements over unpaid gambling debts and their common affection for the same women. Hickok lost a gold watch to Tutt in a poker game. The watch had great sentimental value to Hickok, so he asked Tutt not to wear it in public. They initially agreed not to fight over the watch, but when Hickok saw Tutt wearing it, he warned him to stay away. On July 21, 1865, the two men faced off in Springfield's town square, standing sideways before drawing and firing their weapons. Their quick-draw duel was recorded as the first of its kind. Tutt called out, "Boys, I'm killed", before he collapsed and died.

Two days later, Hickok was arrested for murder. The charge was later reduced to manslaughter. He was released on $2,000 bail and stood trial on August 3, 1865. At the end of the trial, Judge Sempronius H. Boyd told the jury they could not find Hickok acted in self-defense if he could have reasonably avoided the fight. However, if they felt the threat of danger was real and imminent, he instructed they could apply the unwritten law of the "fair fight" and acquit. The jury voted to clear Hickok, resulting in public backlash and criticism of the verdict.

Several weeks later, an interview Hickok gave to Colonel George Ward Nichols, a journalist who subsequently became known as the creator of the Hickok legend, was published in Harper's New Monthly Magazine. Under the name "Wild Bill Hitchcock", the article recounted the "hundreds" of men whom Hickok had personally killed and other exaggerated exploits. The article was controversial wherever Hickok was known, and several frontier newspapers wrote rebuttals.

Deputy U.S. marshal in Kansas
In September 1865, Hickok came in second in the election for city marshal of Springfield. Leaving Springfield, he was recommended for the position of deputy federal marshal at Fort Riley, Kansas. This was during the Indian Wars, in which Hickok sometimes served as a scout for General George A. Custer's 7th Cavalry.

In 1865, Hickok recruited six Native Americans and three cowboys to accompany him to Niagara Falls, where he put on an outdoor demonstration called The Daring Buffalo Chasers of the Plains. Since the event was outdoors, he could not compel people to pay, and the venture was a financial failure. The show featured six buffalo, a bear, and a monkey, and one show ended in disaster when a buffalo refused to act, prompting Hickok to fire a bullet into the sky. This angered the buffalo and panicked audience members, causing the animals to break free of their wire fencing and chase audience members, some of whom were trampled. The incident helped contribute to the overall failure of the show.

Henry M. Stanley, of the Weekly Missouri Democrat, reported Hickok to be "an inveterate hater of Indian People", perhaps to enhance his reputation as a scout and American fighter, but  separating fact from fiction is difficult considering his recruitment of Indians to cross the nation to appear in his own Wild West show. Witnesses confirm that while working as a scout at Fort Harker, Kansas, on May 11, 1867, Hickok was attacked by a large group of Indians, who fled after he shot and killed two. In July, Hickok told a newspaper reporter that he had led several soldiers in pursuit of Indians who had killed four men near the fort on July 2. He reported returning with five prisoners after killing 10. Witnesses confirm that the story was true to the extent the party had set out to find whoever had killed the four men, but the group returned to the fort "without nary a dead Indian, [never] even seeing a live one".

In December 1867, newspapers reported that Hickok had come to stay in Hays City, Kansas. He became a deputy U.S. marshal, and on March 28, 1868, he picked up 11 Union Army deserters who had been charged with stealing government property. Hickok was assigned to bring the men to Topeka for trial, and he requested a military escort from Fort Hays. He was assigned Buffalo Bill Cody, a sergeant, and five privates. They arrived in Topeka on April 2. Hickok remained in Hays through August 1868, when he brought 200 Cheyenne Indians to Hays to be viewed by "excursionists".

On September 1, 1868, Hickok was in Lincoln County, Kansas, where he was hired as a scout by the 10th Cavalry Regiment, a segregated African-American unit. On September 4, Hickok was wounded in the foot while rescuing several cattlemen in the Bijou Creek basin who had been surrounded by Indians. The 10th Regiment arrived at Fort Lyon in Colorado in October and remained there for the rest of 1868.

Marshal of Hays, Kansas

In July 1869, Hickok returned to Hays and was elected city marshal of Hays and sheriff of Ellis County, Kansas, in a special election held on August 23, 1869.  Three sheriffs had quit during the previous 18 months. Hickok may have been acting sheriff before he was elected; a newspaper reported that he arrested offenders on August 18, and the commander of Fort Hays wrote a letter to the assistant adjutant general on August 21 in which he praised Hickok for his work in apprehending deserters.

The regular county election was held on November 2, 1869. Hickok ran as an Independent; but lost to his deputy, Peter Lanihan, who ran  as a Democrat.  Hickok and Lanihan, however, remained sheriff and deputy, respectively.  Hickok accused a J.V. Macintosh of irregularities and misconduct during the election.  On December 9, Hickok and Lanihan both served legal papers on Macintosh, and local newspapers acknowledged that Hickok had guardianship of Hays City.

Killings as sheriff
In September 1869, his first month as sheriff, Hickok killed two men. The first was Bill Mulvey, who was rampaging through town, drunk, shooting out mirrors and whisky bottles behind bars. Citizens warned Mulvey to behave, because Hickok was sheriff. Mulvey angrily declared that he had come to town to kill Hickok. When he saw Hickok, he leveled his cocked rifle at him. Hickok waved his hand past Mulvey at some onlookers and yelled, "Don't shoot him in the back; he is drunk." Mulvey wheeled his horse around to face those who might shoot him from behind, and before he realized he had been fooled, Hickok shot him through the temple.

The second killed by Hickok was Samuel Strawhun, a cowboy, who was causing a disturbance in a saloon at 1:00 am on September 27, when Hickok and Lanihan went to the scene. Strawhun "made remarks against Hickok", and Hickok killed him with a shot through the head. Hickok said he had "tried to restore order". At the coroner's inquest into Strawhun's death, despite "very contradictory" evidence from witnesses, the jury found the shooting justifiable.

On July 17, 1870, Hickok was attacked by two troopers from the 7th U.S. Cavalry, Jeremiah Lonergan and John Kyle (sometimes spelled Kile), in a saloon. Lonergan pinned Hickok to the ground, and Kyle put his gun to Hickok's ear. When Kyle's weapon misfired, Hickok shot Lonergan, wounding him in the knee, and shot Kyle twice, killing him. Hickok lost his re-election bid to his deputy.

Marshal of Abilene, Kansas

On April 15, 1871, Hickok became marshal of Abilene, Kansas. He replaced Tom "Bear River" Smith, who had been killed while serving an arrest warrant on November 2, 1870.  
Outlaw John Wesley Hardin arrived in Abilene at the end of a cattle drive in early 1871. Hardin was a well-known gunfighter, and is known to have killed more than 27 men. In his 1895 autobiography, published after his death, Hardin claimed to have been befriended by Hickok, the newly elected town marshal, after he had disarmed the marshal using the road agent's spin, but Hardin was known to exaggerate. In any case, Hardin appeared to have thought highly of Hickok.

Hickok later said he did not know that "Wesley Clemmons" was Hardin's alias, and that he was a wanted outlaw.  He told Clemmons (Hardin) to stay out of trouble in Abilene and asked him to hand over his guns, and Hardin complied. Hardin alleged that when his cousin, Mannen Clements, was jailed for the killing of two cowhands (Joe and Dolph Shadden) in July 1871, Hickok—at Hardin's request—arranged for his escape.

In August 1871, Hickok sought to arrest Hardin for killing Charles Couger in an Abilene hotel "for snoring too loud".  Hardin left Kansas before Hickok could arrest him.  A newspaper reported, "A man was killed in his bed at a hotel in Abilene, Monday night, by a desperado called Arkansas. The murderer escaped. This was his sixth murder."

Shootout with Phil Coe
Hickok and Phil Coe, a saloon owner and acquaintance of Hardin's, had a dispute that resulted in a shootout. The Bull's Head Saloon in Abilene had been established by gambler Ben Thompson and Coe, his partner, businessman, and fellow gambler. The two entrepreneurs had painted a picture of a bull with a large erect penis on the side of their establishment as an advertisement. Citizens of the town complained to Hickok, who requested that Thompson and Coe remove the image. They refused, so Hickok altered it himself. Infuriated, Thompson tried to incite John Wesley Hardin to kill Hickok by exclaiming to Hardin that "He's a damn Yankee. Picks on rebels, especially Texans, to kill." Hardin was in town under his assumed name Wesley Clemmons, but was better known to the townspeople by the alias "Little Arkansas". He seemed to have respect for Hickok's abilities and replied, "If Bill needs killing, why don't you kill him yourself?" Hoping to intimidate Hickok, Coe allegedly stated that he could "kill a crow on the wing". Hickok's retort is one of the West's most famous sayings (though possibly apocryphal): "Did the crow have a pistol? Was he shooting back? I will be."

On October 5, 1871, Hickok was standing off a crowd during a street brawl when Coe fired two shots. Hickok ordered him to be arrested for firing a pistol within the city limits. Coe claimed that he was shooting at a stray dog, and then suddenly turned his gun on Hickok, who fired first and killed Coe. In another account of the Coe shootout: Theophilus Little, the mayor of Abilene and owner of the town's lumber yard, recorded his time in Abilene by writing in a notebook, which was ultimately given to the Abilene Historical Society. Writing in 1911, he detailed his admiration for Hickok and included a paragraph on the shooting that differs considerably from the reported account:

After shooting Coe, Hickok caught a glimpse of someone running toward him and quickly fired two more shots in reaction, accidentally shooting and killing Abilene Special Deputy Marshal Mike Williams, who was coming to his aid. This was the last time Hickok was ever involved in a gunfight; the accidental death of Deputy Williams was an event that haunted Hickok for the remainder of his life.

Hickok was relieved of his duties as marshal less than two months after the accidental shooting, this incident being only one of a series of questionable shootings and claims of misconduct during his career.

Later life

In 1873, Buffalo Bill Cody and Texas Jack Omohundro invited Hickok to join their troupe after their earlier success. Hickok did not enjoy acting, and often hid behind scenery. In one show, he shot the spotlight when it focused on him. He was released from the group after a few months.

Eye trouble
In 1876, Hickok was diagnosed by a doctor in Kansas City, Missouri, with glaucoma and ophthalmia. Although he was just 39, his marksmanship and health were apparently in decline, and he had been arrested several times for vagrancy, despite earning a good income from gambling and displays of showmanship only a few years earlier.

From 1871 until his death in 1876, Hickok had vision problems. A former cavalryman, J.W. "Doc" Howard, who had known Hickok, stated that Hickok had left Buffalo Bill's Wild West Exhibition "because the lights affected his eyes, so he had to give it up".

Charles Snyder, the Lucien Howe Librarian of Ophthalmology at Harvard Medical School, said "Granular conjunctivitis, ophtalmia, trachoma—call it what you will—was common on the Western Frontier. Jesse James suffered from it."

Marriage
On March 5, 1876, Hickok married Agnes Thatcher Lake, a 50-year-old circus proprietor in Cheyenne, Wyoming Territory. Hickok left his new bride a few months later, joining Charlie Utter's wagon train to seek his fortune in the gold fields of South Dakota.

Shortly before his death, Hickock wrote a letter to his new wife, which read in part, "Agnes Darling, if such should be we never meet again, while firing my last shot, I will gently breathe the name of my wife—Agnes—and with wishes even for my enemies I will make the plunge and try to swim to the other shore."

Martha Jane Cannary, known popularly as Calamity Jane, claimed in her autobiography that she was married to Hickok and had divorced him so he could be free to marry Agnes Lake, but no records that support her account have been found. The two possibly met for the first time after Jane was released from the guardhouse in Fort Laramie and joined the wagon train in which Hickok was traveling. The wagon train arrived in Deadwood in July 1876. Jane confirmed this account in an 1896 newspaper interview, although she claimed she had been hospitalized with illness rather than in the guardhouse.

Death
On August 1, 1876, Hickok was playing poker at Nuttal & Mann's Saloon No. 10 in Deadwood, Dakota Territory. When a seat opened up at the table, a drunk man named Jack McCall sat down to play. McCall lost heavily. Hickok encouraged McCall to quit the game until he could cover his losses and offered to give him money for breakfast. Although McCall accepted the money, he was apparently insulted.

The next day, Hickok was playing poker again. He usually sat with his back to a wall so he could see the entrance, but the only seat available when he joined the game was a chair facing away from the door. He twice asked another man at the table, Charles Rich, to change seats with him, but Rich refused. McCall then entered the saloon, walked up behind Hickok, drew his Colt Model 1873 Single Action Army .45-caliber revolver, and shouted, "Damn you! Take that!" before shooting Hickok in the back of the head at point-blank range.

Hickok died instantly. The bullet emerged through his right cheek and struck another player, riverboat Captain William Massie, in the left wrist. Hickok may have told his friend Charlie Utter and others who were traveling with them that he thought he would be killed while in Deadwood.

Hickok was playing five-card stud or five-card draw when he was shot. He was holding two pairs: black aces and black eights (although there is some dispute as to the suit of one of the aces, diamond vs. spade) as his "up cards", which has since become widely known as the "dead man's hand". The identity of the fifth card (his "hole card") is also the subject of debate.

Jack McCall's two trials

McCall's motive for killing Hickok is the subject of speculation, largely concerning McCall's anger at Hickok's having given him money for breakfast the day before, after McCall had lost heavily.

McCall was summoned before an informal "miners' jury" (an ad hoc local group of miners and businessmen). He claimed he was avenging Hickok's earlier slaying of his brother, which may have been true; a man named Lew McCall had indeed been killed by an unknown lawman in Abilene, Kansas, but whether or not the two McCall men were related is unknown. McCall was acquitted of the murder, which prompted editorializing in the Black Hills Pioneer: "Should it ever be our misfortune to kill a man ... we would simply ask that our trial may take place in some of the mining camps of these hills." Calamity Jane is reputed to have led a mob that threatened McCall with lynching, but at the time of Hickok's death, Jane was actually being held by military authorities.

After bragging about killing Hickok, McCall was rearrested. The second trial was not considered double jeopardy because of the irregular jury in the first trial and because Deadwood was at the time in unorganized Indian country. The new trial was held in Yankton, the capital of the Dakota Territory. Hickok's brother, Lorenzo Butler, traveled from Illinois to attend the retrial. McCall was found guilty and sentenced to death.

Leander Richardson, a reporter, interviewed McCall shortly before his execution, and wrote an article about him for the April 1877 issue of Scribner's Monthly. Lorenzo Butler Hickok spoke with McCall after the trial, and said McCall showed no remorse.

Jack McCall was hanged on March 1, 1877, and buried in a Roman Catholic cemetery. The cemetery was moved in 1881, and when McCall's body was exhumed, the noose was found still around his neck.

Burial

Charlie Utter, Hickok's friend and companion, claimed Hickok's body and placed a notice in the local newspaper, the Black Hills Pioneer, which read:

Almost the entire town attended the funeral, and Utter had Hickok buried with a wooden grave marker reading:

Hickok is known to have fatally shot six men and is suspected of having killed a seventh (McCanles). Despite his reputation, Hickok was buried in the Ingelside Cemetery, Deadwood's original graveyard. This cemetery filled quickly, and in 1879, on the third anniversary of Hickok's original burial, Utter paid to move Hickok's remains to the new Mount Moriah Cemetery. Utter supervised the move and noted that, while perfectly preserved, Hickok had been imperfectly embalmed. As a result, calcium carbonate from the surrounding soil had replaced the flesh, leading to petrifaction. One of the workers, Joseph McLintock, wrote a detailed description of the reinterment. McLintock used a cane to tap the body, face, and head, finding no soft tissue anywhere. William Austin, the cemetery caretaker, estimated . This made it difficult for the men to carry the remains to the new site. The original wooden grave marker was moved to the new site, but by 1891, it had been destroyed by souvenir hunters whittling pieces from it, and it was replaced with a statue. This, in turn, was destroyed by souvenir hunters and replaced in 1902 by a life-sized sandstone sculpture of Hickok. This, too, was badly defaced, and was then enclosed in a cage for protection. The enclosure was cut open by souvenir hunters in the 1950s, and the statue was removed.

Hickok is currently interred in a  square plot at the Mount Moriah Cemetery, surrounded by a cast-iron fence, with a U.S. flag flying nearby. As of 2020, the flag is no longer flown. A monument has been built there.

Calamity Jane was reported to have been buried next to Hickok according to her dying wish. Four of the men on the self-appointed committee who planned Calamity's funeral (Albert Malter, Frank Ankeney, Jim Carson, and Anson Higby) later stated that, since Hickok had "absolutely no use" for Jane in this life, they decided to play a posthumous joke on him by laying her to rest by his side.

Pistols known to have been carried by Hickok
Hickok's favorite guns were a pair of Colt 1851 Navy Model (.36 caliber) cap-and-ball revolvers. They had ivory grips and nickel plating, and were ornately engraved with "J.B. Hickok–1869" on the backstrap. He wore his revolvers butt-forward in a belt or sash (when wearing city clothes or buckskins, respectively), and seldom used holsters; he drew the pistols using a "reverse", "twist", or cavalry draw, as would a cavalryman.

At the time of his death, Hickok was wearing a Smith & Wesson Model No. 2 Army revolver, a five-shot, single-action, .32-caliber weapon, innovative as one of the first metallic cartridge firearms and favored by many Union officers during the Civil War. Bonhams auction company offered this pistol at auction on November 18, 2013, in San Francisco, California, described as Hickok's Smith & Wesson No. 2, serial number 29963, a .32 rimfire with a six-inch barrel, blued finish, and varnished rosewood grips. The gun did not sell because the highest bid of $220,000 was less than the reserve set by the gun's owners.

In popular culture

Hickok has remained one of the most popular and iconic figures of the American Old West, and is still frequently depicted in popular culture, including literature, film, and television.

Paramount Pictures' Western silent film Wild Bill Hickok (released on November 18, 1923) was directed by Clifford Smith and stars William S. Hart as Hickok. A print of the film is maintained in the Museum of Modern Art film archive.

The movie The Plainsman (1936), starring Gary Cooper as Hickok, features the alleged romance between Calamity Jane and him as its main plot line. It is a loose adaptation of Hickok's life, ending with his famous aces-and-eights card hand. A later film (1953) and subsequent stage musical, both titled Calamity Jane, also portray a romance between Calamity Jane and Hickok. In the film version, Howard Keel co-stars as Hickok to Doris Day's Calamity Jane.

Prairie Schooners is a 1940 American Western film directed by Sam Nelson, which stars Wild Bill Elliott as Hickok.

In 1954 an episode of Gunsmoke on CBS radio featured John Dehner as Hickok. Hickok was sent from Abilene to arrest Matt Dillon (William Conrad) for the murder of a man he had thrown out of Dodge earlier that month. In the episode Dillon and Hickok are old friends.

The Adventures of Wild Bill Hickok was a 1950s TV series starring Guy Madison and Andy Devine.

The White Buffalo (1977), starring Charles Bronson as Hickok, tells a tale of Hickok's hunt for a murderous white buffalo that follows him in his nightmares.

A highly fictional film account of Hickok's later years and death, titled Wild Bill (1995), stars Jeff Bridges as Hickok and David Arquette as Jack McCall, and was written and directed by Walter Hill.

Also in 1995, he's depicted as a character in an episode of Legend (TV series) by William Russ, possibly most famous for his role in Wiseguy (TV series). The episode correctly relates Hickok's vision problems late in his life, and also includes his murderer, Jack McCall, in a highly fictionalized role. It ends with Hickok surviving the murder attempt due to wearing body armor and being shot in the back, then secretly leaving for a ranch in California. Since he was actually shot in the back of the head, that plot element is a complete artifice of the episode writers.

A semifictionalized version of Hickok's time as marshal of Abilene Kansas, titled Hickok (2017), stars Luke Hemsworth as Hickok, Trace Adkins as the Bull's Head Saloon keeper Phil Coe, Kris Kristofferson as Abilene mayor George Knox, and Kaiwi Lyman-Mersereau as John Wesley Hardin. It was written by Michael Lanahan and directed by Timothy Woodward Jr.

In the early 1990s ABC television series Young Riders, a fictional account of Pony Express riders, Hickok is portrayed by Josh Brolin.

In the HBO show Deadwood (2004-2006), Wild Bill is played by Keith Carradine.

Hickok is a playable character in the 2018 board game Deadwood 1876 by Façade Games.

Memorials and honorable distinctions
Hickok's birthplace is now the Wild Bill Hickok Memorial and is a listed historic site under the supervision of the Illinois Historic Preservation Agency. The town of Deadwood, South Dakota, re-enacts Hickok's murder and McCall's capture every summer evening. In 1979, Hickok was inducted into the Poker Hall of Fame.

Notes

References

Works cited
 Bird, Roy (1979). "The Custer-Hickok Shootout in Hays City." Real West, May 1979.
 Buel, James Wilson (1881). Heroes of the Plains, or Lives and Adventures of Wild Bill, Buffalo Bill and Other Celebrated Indian Fighters. St. Louis: Historical Publishing.
 DeMattos, Jack (1980). "Gunfighters of the Real West: Wild Bill Hickok." Real West, June 1980.
 Hermon, Gregory (1987). "Wild Bill's Sweetheart: The Life of Mary Jane Owens." Real West, February 1987.
 Matheson, Richard (1996). The Memoirs of Wild Bill Hickok. Jove. .
 Nichols, George Ward (1867). "Wild Bill." Harper's New Monthly Magazine, February 1867.
 O'Connor, Richard (1959). Wild Bill Hickok. Garden City, New York: Doubleday.
 Rosa, Joseph G. (1964, 1974). They Called Him Wild Bill: The Life and Adventures of James Butler Hickok. Norman: University of Oklahoma Press. .
 Rosa, Joseph G. (1977). "George Ward Nichols and the Legend of Wild Bill Hickok." Arizona and the West, Summer 1977.
Rosa, Joseph G. (1979). They called Him Wild Bill, The Life and Adventures of James Butler Hickok, University of Oklahoma Press.  ISBN 978-0-8061-1538-2.
 Rosa, Joseph G. (1979). "J.B. Hickok, Deputy U.S. Marshal." Kansas History: A Journal of the Central Plains, Winter 1979.
 Rosa, Joseph G. (1982, 1994). The West of Wild Bill Hickok. Norman: University of Oklahoma Press. .
 Rosa, Joseph G. (1982). "Wild Bill and the Timber Thieves." Real West, April 1982.
 Rosa, Joseph G. (1984). "The Girl and the Gunfighter: A Newly Discovered Photograph of Wild Bill Hickok." Real West, December 1984.
 Rosa, Joseph G. (1996). Wild Bill Hickok: The Man and His Myth. Lawrence: University Press of Kansas. .
 Rosa, Joseph G. (2003). Wild Bill Hickok Gunfighter: An Account of Hickok's Gunfights. Norman: University of Oklahoma Press. .
 Turner, Thadd M. Wild Bill Hickok: Deadwood City – End of Trail. Universal Publishers, 2001. 
 Wilstach, Frank Jenners (1926). Wild Bill Hickok: The Prince of Pistoleers. Garden City, New York: Doubleday, Page.

External links

 Wild Bill Hickok collection at Nebraska State Historical Society

1837 births
1876 deaths
United States Marshals
American town marshals
Kansas sheriffs
American duellists
American folklore
American murder victims
American poker players
American people of English descent
Deaths by firearm in South Dakota
Gunslingers of the American Old West
Kansas Independents
Lawmen of the American Old West
Nebraska folklore
People from Abilene, Kansas
People from Deadwood, South Dakota
People from Leavenworth, Kansas
People from Troy Grove, Illinois
People murdered in South Dakota
1876 murders in the United States
Poker Hall of Fame inductees
Union Army personnel
Wild West show performers